William Streets (christened 28 February 1772) was an English cricketer who played in a single first-class cricket match in 1803. Streets is known to have played for Nottingham Cricket Club between 1792 and 1800 and played his only first-class match for a combined Nottinghamshire and Leicestershire side in 1803. He was christened in 1772 at Newark-on-Trent in Nottinghamshire.

References

External links

1772 births
English cricketers
English cricketers of 1787 to 1825
Sportspeople from Newark-on-Trent
Cricketers from Nottinghamshire
Year of death unknown